Jaime Alomar Florit (born 24 December 1937) is a retired Spanish road racing cyclist, who competed professionally between 1959 and 1968. He won the 1961 Tour de Picardie, the 1963 Coppa Ugo Agostoni and the third stage of 1963 Giro d'Italia, and rode the Tour de France in 1961, 1962 and 1967. His elder brother Francisco Alomar was also a professional cyclist.

References 

1937 births
Living people
Spanish male cyclists
Sportspeople from Mallorca
Cyclists from the Balearic Islands